The Magic Crystal (released in the Philippines as Fight to Win) is a 1986 Hong Kong action film written and directed by Wong Jing. The film stars Andy Lau, Max Mok and Cynthia Rothrock.

Plot
An important piece of document to be presented as evidence in court the next day against triad boss has been stolen from the Hong Kong police. Due to the time constraints, Sergeant Shek of the Special Duty Unit employs mercenary Andy Lo , known as the "Eagle Hunter", to retrieve it. Andy breaks into the triad boss's mansion where he fights his henchmen and tricks the triad boss into opening his safe where the document is hidden.

Later, Andy receives a letter from his archaeologist friend, Shum Kwan, where he discovered a mysterious artifact in Greece and wants Andy to examine it with him, but also warns him to be cautious as Shum is being tailed by international spies. Andy arrives in Greece with his nephew, Ban-ban, and assistant, Snooker. While Andy was sightseeing at the Parthenon with Ban-ban and Snooker, he bumps into Shum. Shum is ambushed and chased down by KGB thugs posing as Interpol agents. Andy, along with actual agents Cindy Morgan and Billy give chase and beat up the thugs while Shum escapes. Afterwards, Cindy and her partner reveals to Andy that they know of his identity as the Eagle Hunter and informs him of Shum's situation of being hunted by the KGB and persuades him to cooperate with them to help his friend.

Shum arrives at the hotel where Andy was residing but gets shot by a KGB thug posing as Andy's assistant, but manages to subdue the thug before escaping. Afterwards, Shum leaves a baggage containing the mysterious artifact in Andy's hotel room before being captured by Karov, head of the KGB. Shum is then tranquilised by Karov when he refuses to tell him the whereabouts of the artifact, but Karov is able to deduce that it may be kept by Andy.

After returning to Hong Kong, Andy's older sister informs about a phone call for him made by Shum's younger sister, Winnie, and gives him the address of a gymnasium where she trains. Ban-ban also opens the luggage containing the mysterious artifact, the Magic Crystal, a large piece of jade with magical powers and can talk, and befriends the jade. Meanwhile, Andy arrives at Winnie's gymnasium she states she has no news of her brother for a month. Andy, Winnie and Lo Sai, an aggressive pursuer of Winnie, were ambushed by Karov's thugs and Andy fights them off and rescues Winnie. Winnie goes to hide in Andy's house, while Lo Sai also follows, much to everyone's annoyance.

Ban-ban and the jade play tricks on Lo Sai, including swapping his hands and feet and he wakes up in shock. The jade also help Ban-ban beat up a school bully. Sergeant Shek arrives and asks Andy, Winnie and Lo Sai about their attack last night, with the latter hiding the awkward swapping of his limbs. Cindy and his partner also arrive in Hong Kong and briefly speak with Andy, before encountering Karov, who demands Andy to hand over the jade, which confuses Andy. Andy fights off Karov's thug and escape with Winnie and tells Snooker to take a look at their baggage brought back from Greece. At this time, Lo Sai also discovers the jade, who swaps Lo Sai's hands and feet back to normal and gives him a superpower where he can command people to do whatever he says. However, Lo Sai did not catch that the superpower only works within five feet of the jade and he goes to rob a bank by himself and is taken to an asylum as a result.

Andy then receives a call from Sergeant Shek that he as found Shum as is at his house. Andy arrives at Shek's home and finds both Shek and Shum dead while Andy was knocked unconscious. Andy wakes up while Cindy and Billy arrest him thinking he murdered Shek. Meanwhile, Andy's sister was attacked by Karov's thug at home but she fends them off. Karov arrives and fights Andy's sister, outmatching her until Cindy arrives and join forces to fight Karov, who kidnaps Ban-ban and takes the jade.

Karov then hires a thug to kill Andy with ice bullets but fails. Andy then escapes from prison helped by Billy, who reveals the plan to avoid the attention of moles in the police force. The two join with Cindy, Snooker and Andy's sister at Karov's headquarters where they fight off Karov's thug. Karov escapes after Andy engages in a fight with him but they were able to rescue Ban-ban and Cindy suggests to keep the child protected at the police station. At the police station the jade uses its power where Ban-ban leaves the station and takes the jade to Greece by himself while police mole informs Karov the whereabouts of Ban-ban before being punched by Billy.

Andy, Snooker, Cindy and Billy arrive in Greece where Cindy receives intel Ban-ban paid for a boat to a mysterious island. However, Ban-ban is once again captured by Karov on his way to the island but Andy and the crew manage to follow them into a cave. Andy, Cindy, Snooker fall into an underground level full of booby traps while Billy chases Karov, and the trio find a device with the recording Venus detailing his journey to Earth and the jade, which is his technological pet, will help him return to his home planet. Karov, who has Ban-ban in his arms also hear this and a big fight between Andy, Cindy and Billy against Karov and his thugs. Andy and Cindy then join forces to fight Karov who uses a pair of sai against them until Andy delivers a devastating punch on Karov. Karov then chase Ban-ban but Andy subdues Karov with a big statue and Ban-ban is able to use the jade to help Venus return home while Karov furious jumps into the wave bringing Venus home and is transported out of Earth. The jade dies after using all its energy and bids farewell to a crying Ban-ban before it hatches a baby jade, much to the delight of the child.

Cast
Max Mok as Billy, Cindy's Interpol partner.
Cynthia Rothrock as Cindy Morgan, an Interpol agent.
Natalis Chan as Lo Sai (老細), an aggressive pursuer of Winnie with low IQ and can be easily manipulated by the Magic Crystal.
Siu Ban-ban as Ban-ban (彬彬), Andy's nephew who befriends the Magic Crystal.
Wong Jing as Snooker, Andy's bumbling assistant.
Sharla Cheung as Winnie Shum (沈雲妮), Shum Kwan's younger sister.
Shum Wai as a triad boss captured by Andy.
Chung Fat as the triad boss's thug who fought Andy.
Hung San-nam as the triad boss's thug who fought Andy.
Phillip Ko as Shum Kwan (沈昆), Andy's archeologist friend who discovered the Magic Cristal in Greece and is hunted by Karov.
Wong Mei-mei as Andy's older sister and Ban-ban's mother.
Eddie Maher as Karovis thug in Greece
Tony Leung Siu-hung as  Karov's thug in Greece 
Richard Norton as Karov, leader of the KGB who is after the Magic Crystal.
Shih Kien as Sergeant Shek (石探長), Andy's employer.
Shing Fui-On as a prisoner who is a friisd of Andy.
Jackson Ng as Karov's thug who wears a red headband and fought Cindy and Andy's sister.
Yu Mo-lin as Maureen Yu, head coach at Winnie's gymnasium.
Albert Lai as a cop.
David Ho as Steve's father.

Production
According to Rothrock, she injured her right ACL while Norton suffered a staph infection on his leg in the Philippines prior to the start of the film's production. Rothrock re-injured her knee while filming the fight scene in Greece; the pain caused her to accidentally stab her opponent with her spear. She also accidentally slashed Norton on the eyebrow during their fight scene.

The film features Rothrock's extensive use of weapons, as well as the Eagle Claw and Northern Praying Mantis fighting styles.

Release
The Magic Crystal was released in the Philippines as Fight to Win by Pioneer Releasing, and became a box office hit, introducing Cynthia Rothrock (credited as Cindy Rothrock) to Filipino audiences. Numerous imported films were later released under new titles by various distributors to make them appear as sequels to the film:
Fight to Win II (original title: Righting Wrongs), released by First Films on March 17, 1987
Fight to Win Again (original title: A Book of Heroes), released by Pioneer Releasing on August 25, 1987
Fight to Win: New Chapter (starring "Billy Chan" from Bloodsport), released by Pioneer Releasing on July 13, 1988
The Last Fight to Win: The Bloody End (original title: Low Blow), released by Movierama Films on October 13, 1988

See also
Andy Lau filmography
Wong Jing filmography

References

External links

1986 films
1980s action comedy films
1980s Cantonese-language films
1986 action films
1986 comedy films
1986 martial arts films
Films directed by Wong Jing
Films set in Greece
Films set in Hong Kong
Films shot in Greece
Films shot in Hong Kong
Hong Kong action comedy films
Hong Kong martial arts comedy films
Kung fu films
Triad films
1980s Hong Kong films